The Central market of Concepción is a marketplace of fruits and vegetables with restaurants in the downtown area of Concepción. The area of the Central market is 3.600 m2. After the earthquake of Chillán on 1939, the Central market was designed on 1940 by the architects Tibor Weiner and Ricardo Mulle.

See also 
 Central market
 Concepción

References

External links 
 Location & some photos of the Central market 
 More about the Central market 

Buildings and structures in Biobío Region
Retail markets in Chile